Vincent van den Ende (born October, 08 1992), known professionally as Avedon, is a Dutch record producer. He is best known for his work with American hip-hop and R&B musicians such as Chris Brown, Megan Thee Stallion, Trippie Redd, Chloe x Halle, 6ix9ine, Roddy Ricch, Russ, Shy Glizzy and Thutmose. He is also closely associated with American record producer Scott Storch whom he shares a studio with and works with.

Early life and career 
Vincent van den Ende was born in Amsterdam to theatrical producer Joop van den Ende and is currently based in Los Angeles, In 2020, he signed a record deal with Warner Music Benelux.

Selected production discography 
Credits taken from Tidal.

Awards and nominations

External links

References 

Dutch record producers
Living people
Date of birth unknown
21st-century Dutch musicians
Hip hop record producers
Dutch hip hop DJs
Musicians from Amsterdam
1992 births